An accounting analyst evaluates public company financial statements. Public companies issue these (10-K) annual financial statements as required by the Security and Exchange Commission. The statements include the balance sheet, the income statement, the statement of cash flows and the notes to the financial statements.  Specifically, the notes to the financial statements contain considerable quantitative detail supporting the financial statements along with narrative information.

Description
This individual has extensive training in understanding financial accounting principles for public companies based on generally accepted accounting principles as provided by the Financial Accounting Standards Board.  Or, he/she may have additional experience in applying international accounting standards based on the rules put out by the International Accounting Standards Board.

As an example, the accounting analyst may work for a financial research company evaluating differing financial accounting principles and how they influence the company's reported wealth.

Professional Requirements
The accounting analyst will most likely hold an accounting qualification. The analyst may have an MBA  degree with an Accounting specialization.

In addition, the analyst may hold the Chartered Certified Accountant (ACCA) or Certified Public Accountant (CPA) or Chartered Accountant (CA or ACA) designation.

See also
Accountant
Financial analyst

Accountancy occupations
Financial analysts